The 1990–91 season was Manchester United's 89th season in the Football League, and their 16th consecutive season in the top division of English football.

After winning the FA Cup the previous year to end a five-year trophy drought and claim their first major trophy under the management of Alex Ferguson, United went on to achieve more success by lifting the European Cup Winners' Cup – their first European trophy since their European Cup triumph 23 years earlier – by beating Barcelona 2–1 in Rotterdam, with Mark Hughes scoring both goals. It was the first season back in European competitions for English clubs following the lifting of the ban which had been imposed back in 1985 due to the Heysel Stadium disaster.

Hughes was voted PFA Player of the Year, while promising young winger Lee Sharpe was voted PFA Young Player of the Year. Fellow winger Ryan Giggs, aged 17 and said to be the club's finest young prospect since George Best, signed a professional contract in late November, and soon broke into the first team, making two league appearances and scoring one goal. A new arrival at the club was full-back Denis Irwin, signed from Oldham Athletic for a fee of £625,000 in the close season. Following his impressive performance in the previous season's FA Cup final replay, Les Sealey's loan move became permanent on a one-year contract, and he was the club's first choice goalkeeper for the season, but left on a free transfer at the season's end and signed for Aston Villa.

United also reached the League Cup final for the second time, but suffered a shock defeat to Sheffield Wednesday (managed by former United boss Ron Atkinson). In the league, United improved upon the previous season's 13th-place finish, but erratic form meant that they failed to mount a title challenge and finished sixth and were below neighbours Manchester City for the first time in more than a decade. Their defence of the FA Cup ended in the Fifth Round when they lost 2–1 to Norwich City.

Assistant manager Archie Knox resigned late in the campaign to take the same role at Rangers, and was replaced by Brian Kidd.

It was the final season at Old Trafford for veteran defender Viv Anderson, who had failed to reclaim his place in the first team and was sold to Sheffield Wednesday in January 1991. Winger Ralph Milne, who had not played a first team game for the club for nearly two years, was given a free transfer at the end of the season. Colin Gibson, who had rarely been selected since the 1988–89 season, was sold to Leicester City just before Christmas.

Goalkeeper Gary Walsh, who stood in for the injured Les Sealey in several late season games, made his first appearances for United in three years.

Lee Martin, the hero of the previous season's FA Cup final, suffered a back injury and appeared in less than half of the season's games, as Alex Ferguson chose Denis Irwin as his regular right-back and Clayton Blackmore as his regular left-back. Striker Mark Robins, another star of the cup run, had a less successful season, with fewer first team opportunities and just five goals in all competitions, despite some promising performances in the autumn.

Pre-season and friendlies

FA Charity Shield

First Division

FA Cup

League Cup

Cup Winners' Cup

Events of the season
The 1989–90 campaign had brought Alex Ferguson his first major trophy in four seasons as manager of Manchester United, as they defeated Crystal Palace after a replay to win the FA Cup for the seventh time, equalling the record held by Aston Villa and Tottenham Hotspur. However, their league form had arguably been their worst since relegation 16 years earlier, as they finished 13th in the First Division, and the squad still needed a few changes before United could be seen as serious title challengers.

Goalkeeper Les Sealey had received a permanent contract after a successful loan spell at Old Trafford that had begun the previous December when he joined from Luton Town, and for the 1990–91 season Ferguson chose Sealey as his first choice goalkeeper. Previous first choice goalkeeper Jim Leighton remained at the club, facing competition for second choice status from the younger Gary Walsh and Mark Bosnich. Ferguson's only other major signing of the summer was Denis Irwin, the Republic of Ireland international who joined from Oldham Athletic and was capable of playing on either side of defence, providing competition for Mike Phelan on the right and Lee Martin and Clayton Blackmore on the left. The midfield line-up was similarly impressive – Paul Ince, Neil Webb, Bryan Robson and Danny Wallace – with the added bonus of Phelan also being able to play in central midfield or on the right side. 19-year-old Lee Sharpe was capable of playing on either wing, showing promise as a star of the future. In attack, Mark Hughes and Brian McClair were an established partnership but 21-year-old Mark Robins was looking like a top striker of the future and a possible threat to McClair's place in the team.

On 10 July 1990, UEFA confirmed that English clubs would be able to compete in European competitions after five years following the Heysel disaster, meaning that Manchester United would be able to compete in the European Cup Winners' Cup.

The league season began six weeks later with a 2–0 home win over Coventry City in the First Division, a week after they were joint winners of the FA Charity Shield with a 1–1 draw against Liverpool at Wembley Stadium.

On 19 September, Manchester United marked their return to European competition with a 2–0 win over Pecsi Munkas of Hungary in the first round first leg of the European Cup Winners' Cup, progressing to the next stage of the European Cup Winners' Cup two weeks later by winning the second leg 1–0. By that date, they had also progressed to the Football League Cup third round with a 5–2 aggregate win over Halifax Town in the second round.

There were ugly scenes at Old Trafford on 20 October, when all 11 Manchester United players and 10 Arsenal players were involved in a brawl in the First Division clash at Old Trafford. Arsenal won 1–0 but United were docked a league point for this, while Arsenal (who, by this stage, were the biggest threat to leaders Liverpool in the title race) were docked two points and both clubs were fined £50000.

Three days later, Manchester United defeated Wrexham 3–0 in the European Cup Winners' Cup second round first leg at Old Trafford. At the end of the month, they eliminated Liverpool from the Football League Cup in the third round with a 3–1 win at Old Trafford, condemning the First Division leaders to their first defeat in a competitive game that season.

A 5–0 aggregate win over Wrexham completed on 7 November took them into the quarter-finals of the European Cup Winners' Cup.

On 27 November, Alex Ferguson offered a five-year contract to Ryan Giggs, a winger said to be the finest prospect in the British game since George Best. Giggs, who was born in Cardiff, would be eligible to sign a professional contract from his 17th birthday two days later. He obliged, and his first team debut was looking inevitable.

The day before Ryan Giggs signed for Manchester United, fellow youngster Lee Sharpe scored a hat-trick for Manchester United as they defeated Arsenal 6–2 in the Football League Cup fourth round at Highbury, meaning that the Football League Cup wouldn't be heading to North London in 1991. Sharpe had another fine game four days later when he scored the only goal of the game at Goodison Park in a 1–0 win over Everton, who had made a dismal start to the First Division campaign and were in the bottom half of the table just 12 months after being title contenders.

1991 began with 2–1 win for Alex Ferguson's men at Tottenham Hotspur, though the biggest piece of news arising from the game was that the opposition's Paul Gascoigne became the first player to be sent off in a live televised First Division game.

Six days later, their defence of the FA Cup began with a 2–1 win over Queen's Park Rangers in the third round at Old Trafford, and the following week they drew 1–1 at Southampton in the Football League Cup quarter-final, winning the replay 3–2 at Old Trafford thanks to a Mark Hughes hat-trick. Before the month was out, United defeated Third Division Bolton Wanderers 1–0 in the FA Cup fourth round at Old Trafford.

On 10 February 1991, Manchester United beat Leeds United 2–1 in the Football League Cup semi-final first leg at Old Trafford, and two weeks later they reached the final by winning the second leg 1–0. A week earlier, however, their FA Cup defence had ended in the fifth round with a 2–1 defeat at Norwich City, a side who had given the big clubs a surprise run for their money several times in the last five years.

2 March saw the much awaited debut of Ryan Giggs, who came on as a substitute for the injured Denis Irwin in a 2–0 home defeat by Everton in the First Division.

Four days later, Manchester United drew 1–1 at home to Montpellier HSC in the European Cup Winners' Cup quarter-final first leg, reaching the semi-final two weeks later by winning the return leg 2–0 in France.

The contest for a place in the final began on 10 April with a 3–1 away win over Legia Warsaw of Poland in the European Cup Winners' Cup semi-final first leg.

On 21 April, Manchester United suffered a surprise 1–0 defeat to Sheffield Wednesday (managed by their former manager Ron Atkinson) in the Football League Cup final. The only goal of the game was scored by Irish international midfielder John Sheridan, a self-confessed Manchester United supporter. Three days later, however, they reached the European Cup Winners' Cup final for the first time with a 4–2 aggregate win over Legia Warsaw.

The final was won on 15 May 1991 in Rotterdam thanks to a 2–1 win over FC Barcelona, with Mark Hughes scored both goals against the team he had spent an unsuccessful campaign with four seasons earlier.

1990–91 was another highly successful season for Manchester United after a few years of frustration, with the boardroom featuring a major trophy once more. They had also been runners-up in a second cup final. It was the first time in 23 years that United had won a major trophy in successive seasons. Their league form had also improved, but a lack of consistency restricted them to a sixth-place finish – one place below City, who had not finished above them for more than a decade. The league title went to Arsenal for the second time in three seasons, while Liverpool finished second in what at the time was unusually a trophyless season for them. United were not the only side threatening to break up the recent Liverpool-Arsenal dominance of English football. A year after taking United to a replay in the FA Cup final, former United player Steve Coppell enjoyed another successful season with Crystal Palace, who finished third in the league. Another former United player, Gordon Strachan, was a key player in Leeds United's impressive return to the First Division as the West Yorkshire side finished fourth. There was also a threat emerging from the blue half of Manchester for the first time in a decade, as City finished fifth under new player-manager Peter Reid.

Les Sealey's one-year contract expired at the end of the season, and he now wanted a two-year deal, but departed on a free transfer to Aston Villa after being offered only a one-year deal. Also on his way out of the club was Ralph Milne, given a free transfer more than a year after his final first-team appearance.

During the close season, United added the Brøndby and Denmark goalkeeper Peter Schmeichel and QPR's England right-back Paul Parker to their ranks. The existing squad was already impressive, with young wingers Lee Sharpe and Ryan Giggs looking like highly exciting prospects for the future, and players like Neil Webb, Danny Wallace, Clayton Blackmore and Mark Robins being some of the best squad players that any club in the country had at their disposal.

1991–92 would be United's 25th season since their last league title triumph, and Alex Ferguson was determined to make sure that the title wait would end then.

Squad statistics

Transfers

In

Out

Loan out

References

1990-91
Manchester United
UEFA Cup Winners' Cup-winning seasons